Stefan Ström (born 13 December 1977 in Gävle, Gävleborg) is a retired male boxer from Sweden, who competed for his native country at the 1996 Summer Olympics in Atlanta, Georgia. There he was stopped in the first round of the men's light flyweight division (– 48 kg) by Cuba's title contender Yosvani Aguilera.

References
 sports-reference

1977 births
Living people
Flyweight boxers
Boxers at the 1996 Summer Olympics
Olympic boxers of Sweden
People from Gävle
Swedish male boxers
Sportspeople from Gävleborg County